Best the Back Horn is a compilation album release of the Japanese rock band, The Back Horn. The album was released on January 23, 2008 to celebrate the 10th anniversary of the band.

Track list

Disc 1
Sunny (サニー) – 3:55
First major single.
Namida ga Koboretara (涙がこぼれたら) – 4:44
Fourth major single.
Hikari no Kesshou (光の結晶) – 5:22
Sixth major single.
Mirai (未来) – 5:18
Fifth major single and theme song to the movie Akarui Mirai.
KIZUNA Song (キズナソング) – 6:02
Tenth major single.
Ikusen Kounen no Kodoku (幾千光年の孤独) – 4:21
Song from the first major album Ningen Program.
Seimeisen (生命線) – 4:33
Seventh major single.
Hitorigoto (ひとり言＜New Mix＞) – 4:34
Song from the indie album Yomigaeru Hi.
Utsukushii Namae (美しい名前) – 5:26
Fifteenth major single.
Hajimete no Kokyuu de (初めての呼吸で) – 5:16
Twelfth major single.
Chaos Diver (カオスダイバー) – 4:53
Thirteenth major single.
Kiseki (奇跡) – 5:28
Song from the fourth major album Headphone Children and theme song to the Japanese horror movie Zoo.

Disc 2
Requiem (レクイエム) – 5:20
Eighth major single B-side and theme song to the movie Casshern.
Cobalt Blue (コバルトブルー) – 4:26
Ninth major single.
Black Hole Birthday (ブラックホールバースデイ) – 5:07
Eleventh major single.
Natsukusa no Yureru Oka (夏草の揺れる丘) – 4:56
Song from the second major album Shinzou Orchestra.
Yume no Hana (夢の花) – 4:38
Eighth major single.
Sora, Hoshi, Umi no Yoru (空、星、海の夜) – 5:38
Second major single.
Maihime (舞姫) – 4:46
Song from the sixth major album The Back Horn.
Wana (罠) – 4:22
Sixteenth major single and the first ending theme to the anime series Mobile Suit Gundam 00.
Sekaiju no Shita de (世界樹の下で) – 5:02
Third major single.
Fuusen (風船) – 4:52
Indie single.
Fuyu no Milk (冬のミルク＜New Recording＞) – 4:46
Song from the indie mini-album Doko e Yuku.
Koe (声) – 4:21
Fourteenth major single.
Yaiba (刃) – 3:29
Theme song to the movie Sakigake!! Otokojuku.

Personnel

 Yamada Masashi - vocals
 Suganami Eijun - guitar
 Okamine Koushu - bass
 Matsuda Shinji - drums

The Back Horn albums
2008 greatest hits albums
Victor Entertainment compilation albums